The list of ship decommissionings in 1939 includes a chronological list of all ships decommissioned in 1939.


See also 

1939
 Ship decommissionings
Ship